Melinda "Mel" Sordino (born February 18) is the main character and narrator of Laurie Halse Anderson's 1999 novel Speak. Her last name, Sordino, is an Italian word that can be translated as "deaf." The character's ordeals were based on Anderson's own experiences; she was raped one summer prior to starting high school.

Storyline

Speak
One summer, prior to starting her first day at Merry Weather High School, 14-year-old Melinda "Mel" Sordino goes to a house party with three other friends and is raped by a senior, Andy Evans.  This abuse forces her into silence and drastically changes her life and social structure; in fact, for most of the novel, she refers to Andy only as IT as that exasperated her vatic bitter malaise when she called the 911 in a party because of the grope, that ended the party so she was called a snitch  and a girl reprimanded Melinda. "My brother got arrested at that party. He got fired because of the arrest. I can't believe you did that. Asshole."  

She finds solace in her art class and teacher, Mr. Freeman, where she has a year-long assignment of drawing a tree which plays a major role in her life. Throughout the year she slowly creates a hidden room for herself in an old janitor's closet, which acts as her safe haven, and is the setting for the climactic ending of the novel.

Throughout the year, several minor events led up to her coming forward about her rape. These events include her parents giving her art supplies (showing that they care), her only companion and friend Heather leaving her for the clique called the Marthas and saying Melinda needs therapy, seeing things written about Andy on the bathroom wall and cutting school the next day.

For the majority of the novel, she refuses to admit to herself that she was raped — a fact that makes it hard for Melinda to heal and continue with her life. Melinda attempts to confide in her ex-best friend Rachel, who is dating Andy and initially doesn't believe her. Rachel later realizes the truth after Andy groped her during a dance; she then avoids Andy for fear of getting raped by him. When Andy angrily confronts her about talking to Rachel and attempts to rape her again, Melinda fights back and finally breaks her silence, which sets her free from her isolation and terror; they are found by the school's lacrosse team and, because of Rachel telling people around the school about Andy's actions and his past victims having begun to come forward after seeing Melinda's brief message about Andy on a stall in the girls' restroom, their altercation removes any doubt of his guilts. Therefore, Andy would face the consequences of his crimes against Melinda.

Catalyst

In Anderson's 2002 novel Catalyst, Melinda Sordino appears for a few pages, now in tenth grade at Merryweather High and having regained control over her life. When a fellow student, Kate Malone, has a mental breakdown, she counsels and helps her through the rough patch. It is stated that Andy Evans is found guilty but does not go to prison; instead, he is sentenced to probation and has to register as a sex offender, typically is under house arrest (an alternative to prison), must be electronically tagged by an ankle monitor when completing his penalty, having limited contacts to others except his caregivers (his parents and other immediate family members), and ordered to stay away from Melinda and her family at all times. Thus, his life becomes difficult owing to having a criminal record as a rapist, being shunned by his community and his daily activities after high school such as attending school, work, probation appointments, counseling, or community servicing are restricted by the law and closely monitored by probation officers until he finishes his sentence.

In the 10th anniversary edition of Speak, Anderson explained that she was seriously considering making a sequel, but could not think of a basic plot, citing that sequels are usually meant to build on a previous film's popularity, using Jaws: The Revenge as an example.

Voice
Melinda is the first person narrator of Speak.  She is very observant and notices every small detail. Her abuse has made her cynical (such as thinking she is too old to celebrate Halloween despite her schoolmates dressing up, as well as no longer believing in Santa), though she is very secretive about it. The cliques and social groups (or "clans") at her school disgust her, a fact which she makes well known through her narration.

At times, her voice seems to be just a stream of consciousness, having little or no start nor end.  The sentence structure is often short and choppy, representing how Melinda is feeling at the moment.

Appearance 
Melinda's physical appearance is rarely described, except in the context of what clothing she is wearing and how her lips are chapped and scabbed over. It is also mentioned that she is a size ten while trying on jeans at the store her mother works at. It is also mentioned she has black eyebrows and "muddy" brown eyes. Her mother buys her clothing, which she dislikes, and her lips are always bloody and dry from the fact that she bites them when she sees Andy Evans, or when something bad happens to her.  It is mentioned in "Winter Break" that she is not extremely pretty, which shows that Melinda is just an average looking girl. In the chapter "Hall of Mirrors", it is told that Melinda wears a size ten pants. It also mentions she has auburn hair in one of the chapters.

In other media

She is portrayed by Kristen Stewart in the 2004 film adaptation.

References

Child characters in film
Child characters in literature
Fictional artists
Fictional characters from New York (state)
Literary characters introduced in 1999
Characters in American novels of the 20th century
Characters in American novels of the 21st century
Fictional characters with post-traumatic stress disorder
Fictional characters based on real people
Fictional victims of sexual assault